Perumparampu Sri Mahadeva Temple  is located at Edappal in Malappuram district. The main deity of the temple is Shiva in the sanctum sanctorum facing west. It is believed that this temple is one of the 108 Shiva temples of Kerala and is installed by sage Parasurama dedicated to Shiva. The temple is located around 3km away from Edappal on the route of Edappal - Parappuram - Ayankalam Road. The main sanctum santorium is two storey building shape of square in Kukkudakruthy styled and is centuries old. Sri Parashurama is believed to have started this shiva lingam at ancient Paraparampu village.

See also
 108 Shiva Temples
 Temples of Kerala

Temple images

References

108 Shiva Temples
Shiva temples in Kerala
Hindu temples in Malappuram district